Benwood is an unincorporated community in Van Buren Township, Clay County, Indiana, United States. It is part of the Terre Haute Metropolitan Statistical Area.

History
A post office was established at Benwood in 1881, and remained in operation until it was discontinued in 1882. Benwood was likely named in honor of Ben Davis, a railroad official.

Mining was the originally the primary industry of Benwood.

Geography

References

Unincorporated communities in Clay County, Indiana
Unincorporated communities in Indiana
Terre Haute metropolitan area